is a Japanese Rinzai Rōshi, a successor in the Tenryū-ji line of Rinzai Zen, a teacher of Jikishinkage-ryū swordsmanship, and a calligrapher.

Sasaki Roshi founded the Ryu-Un-Zendo in Tokyo in 1984 and since 1992 he has been teaching at the Asahi Cultural Centre, also located in Tokyo.

References

External links
 Ryū-Un Zendō

Japanese calligraphers
Rinzai Buddhists
Zen Buddhist spiritual teachers
Japanese Zen Buddhists
Japanese religious leaders
Living people
1947 births